Young Women's College Preparatory Academy (YWCPA) is a secondary (middle and high) school for girls in Houston, Texas that is a part of the Houston Independent School District. It opened in 2011 in the former Contemporary Learning Center (CLC) building.

The school is located in the Third Ward area. The Foundation for the Education of Young Women and HISD partnered in order to develop the school. The foundation committed $1 million to start the school. The plan initially called for the school to be housed at CLC, but the agenda items, including the plan, were tabled until December 2010.

Curriculum
By 2023, YWCPA began an Advanced Placement African-American History course.

See also

 Young Men's College Preparatory Academy
 Women's education in the United States

References

Further reading
 "HISD to consider district's first all-girls school." KTRK-TV. Monday November 8, 2010.
 Connelly, Richard. "HISD To Consider All-Girls School." Houston Press. Friday November 5, 2010.
 Mellon, Ericka. "Girls find paths to shine in female-only schools." Houston Chronicle. November 16, 2010.
 Mellon, Ericka. "Girls find paths to shine in female-only schools." Houston Chronicle. November 16, 2010.
 Rivas, Elissa. "HISD board approves district's 1st all-girl school." KTRK-TV. Friday November 12, 2010.
 "HISD To Open All-Girls School." KPRC-TV. Friday November 12, 2010.
 "Board Approves Creation of First All-Girls School." HISD. November 12, 2010. (PDF)

External links
 Young Women's College Preparatory Academy
 Young Women's College Preparatory Academy at Houston ISD

Girls' schools in Texas
Houston Independent School District middle schools
Houston Independent School District high schools
Magnet schools in Houston
Public girls' schools in the United States
Public high schools in Houston
Public middle schools in Houston
Educational institutions established in 2011
2011 establishments in Texas